Summitville may refer to some places in the United States:

Summitville, Indiana
Summitville, New York
Summitville, Ohio
Summitville mine, in Colorado